Canut's horseshoe bat (Rhinolophus canuti) is a species of bat in the family Rhinolophidae. It is endemic to Indonesia.

Taxonomy and etymology
It was described as a new species in 1909 by Oldfield Thomas and Robert Charles Wroughton. They chose the species name "canuti" to honor Danish mammalogist Knud Andersen. "Canute" is an anglicization of the Danish name "Knud."
Thomas and Wroughton chose to honor Andersen when naming the species "in recognition of the exhaustive work he has done on this complicated and difficult group."

Description
Its skull has a rostral projection; the projection is on the top of the skull, with its leading edge aligned over the fourth premolar. It has a very narrow connecting process between the sella and the posterior lancet.

Biology
It is insectivorous. It is nocturnal, roosting in sheltered places during the day such as caves.
These roosts likely consist of many individuals, as it is presumed to be a colonial species.

Range and habitat
It is found on the Indonesian islands of Bali and Java.

Conservation
It is currently evaluated as vulnerable by the IUCN. It is thought that its population size is decreasing.

References

Rhinolophidae
Bats of Indonesia
Endemic fauna of Indonesia
Vulnerable fauna of Asia
Mammals described in 1909
Taxa named by Oldfield Thomas
Taxa named by Robert Charles Wroughton
Taxonomy articles created by Polbot